The Heartland Museum of Military Vehicles (HMMV) in Lexington, Nebraska, is a non-profit organization run by volunteers and funded by donations and grants.  The museum's goal is to restore, preserve and display historic military equipment of all types, as a way to honor those who served.  It is located near exit 237 of Interstate 80. There is no entry fee; donations are optional. It is open from 10 am - 5 pm Monday-Saturday, and 1 pm - 5 pm on Sundays.

History
In 1986, armed only with a determination to preserve historic military vehicles, four Lexington men formed the Heartland Museum. Today the dozens of fully restored vehicles are dedicated in honor and memory of those who served.

In 1991, a permanent site for the museum was obtained at exit 237 of Interstate 80. In 1998, a  Visitor Center was constructed which houses many of the vehicles.

Collection 
The museum has about 100 vehicles including helicopters, tanks, half-tracks, ambulances, and a jeep from every branch of the service. There are also displays of weapons, uniforms, engines, equipment, and more. The everyday necessities of a soldier's life, such as MREs, blend with unique vehicles, like those used by the German army in World War II.

Staff are very helpful and will tell you just about everything to know about each vehicle at the site. One of the attractions is the prototype HMMWV, serial number 1. Children can explore the interior of a Mike model Huey helicopter, and two tanks.

References

External links
 Heartland Museum of Military Vehicles - Official website

Military vehicle preservation
Museums in Dawson County, Nebraska
Military and war museums in Nebraska
Automobile museums in Nebraska
Tank museums